Hurricane Township is an inactive township in Lincoln County, in the U.S. state of Missouri.

Hurricane Township took its name from a former creek of the same name within its borders, where a "hurricane" (archaic term for tornado) had struck.

References

Townships in Missouri
Townships in Lincoln County, Missouri